Terenzo is a comune (municipality) in the Province of Parma in the Italian region Emilia-Romagna, located about  west of Bologna and about  southwest of Parma.

The municipality of Terenzo contains the frazioni (subdivisions, mainly villages and hamlets) Bardone, Boschi di Bardone, Case Castellani, Cassio, Castello, Castello di Casola, Cazzola, Corniana, Goiano, Lesignano Palmia, Lughero, Palmia, Puilio, Selva Grossa, Stazione Bocchetto, Villa, Villa di Casola, and Viola.

At the foot of Monte Zirone, is the slender former church or Pieve di San Michele di Corniana, dedicate to St Michael Archangel. Also nearby is the Pieve di Bardone, completed prior to 13th-century.

Terenzo borders the following municipalities: Berceto, Calestano, Fornovo di Taro, Sala Baganza, Solignano.

Demographic evolution

References

External links
 www.comune.terenzo.pr.it/

Cities and towns in Emilia-Romagna